Ruja is the self-titled LP by Estonian rock band Ruja, follow-up to the EP of the same title.

Track listing

A-side
"Õunalaul" (Apple song) (Rein Rannap/Ott Arder)
"Doktor Noormann" (Doctor Noormann) (Rein Rannap)
"To Mr Lennon" (Urmas Alender)
"Tule minuga sööklasse" (Come to the diner with me) (Rein Rannap/Ott Arder)
"Inimene õpib" (Human learns) (Rein Rannap/Ott Arder)

B-side
"Kus on see mees?" (Where's the man?) (Rein Rannap/Ott Arder)
"Lapsena televisioonis" (In television as a kid) (Jaanus Nõgisto/Juhan Viiding)
"Rahu" (Peace) (Rein Rannap/Urmas Alender)
"Eile nägin ma Eestimaad!" (Yesterday I saw Estonia!) (Rein Rannap/Ott Arder)
"Siin oled sündinud" (Here you're born) (Rein Rannap/Paul-Eerik Rummo)

Personnel

Urmas Alender (vocals)
Jaanus Nõgisto (guitar)
Rein Rannap (keyboards)
Tiit Haagma (bass)
Jaan Karp (drums)

External links

1982 albums
Ruja albums
Estonian-language albums